Jan Wolfgarten (born March 17, 1982, in Frankfurt am Main) is a German swimmer. He participates in the open water events.

He won the bronze medal at the Team 5 km world championships.

References

Living people
1982 births
Male long-distance swimmers
German male swimmers
World Aquatics Championships medalists in open water swimming
Sportspeople from Frankfurt
20th-century German people
21st-century German people